Itzikl Kramtweiss (c. 1878 - 1958) or Krantweiss, also known by the anglicized name Isadore Krantweiss, was a Russian-born American klezmer musician and recording artist of the early twentieth century.

Biography
Kramtweiss was born in January 1876 or 1878, in Teplyk, Podolian Governorate, Russian Empire. By 1906 he was living in Ternopil,  Galicia, Austria-Hungary, and was married to his wife Sarah (Schewa, née Noten). In 1913 he emigrated to the United States, landing in Boston in May of that year. He apparently stayed in Boston for at least three years, as his son Harry was born there in 1916. By 1918 he had relocated to Trenton, New Jersey, where he ran a music store.

In Philadelphia, where he settled by 1919, he became known as a klezmer clarinetist. These recordings included klezmer bulgars as well as polkas. In the 1930s he remained a popular player in the city's Jewish music circuit. He had a reputation as a "wild character". He also gained work due to his birthplace; the Teplyk Landsmanshaft regularly hired him and Cornet player Nachman Grossman.

He died on October 1, 1958. He was buried in the Mount Sharon Cemetery in Springfield, Pennsylvania.

References

1870s births
1958 deaths
Year of birth uncertain
Klezmer musicians
American clarinetists
Ukrainian Jews
20th-century American musicians
People from Vinnytsia Oblast
Jews from the Russian Empire
Victor Records artists
Musicians from Philadelphia